The Layover EP is the first EP by Dilated Peoples member Evidence, released on November 25, 2008, by Decon.

Background 
The idea for The Layover EP originally came about while Evidence was on tour with Little Brother, and was originally going to be a 5 track release produced entirely by North Carolina producer Khrysis for free download. He later strayed from the idea and decided to make it an official release. Evidence cites Ice Cube's Kill at Will, Pete Rock & CL Smooth's All Souled Out and Bone Thugs-n-Harmony's Creepin on ah Come Up as influences for the project, saying they were examples of EPs "that were really quality" and served as the perfect vehicle to get the next album released shortly after.

DJ Premier ranked the album 2nd in his top 20 albums of 2008 list.

In the video for "The Far Left" when The Alchemist says "To the atmosphere so I can really find out" he holds up a drawing of a slug and an ant. This is a reference to the hip hop group Atmosphere, which consist of rapper Slug and producer Ant.

The Layover Mixtape 
In addition with the release of The Layover EP, Evidence collaborated with DJ Skee to produce The Layover Mixtape which was available on Evidence's Myspace for free download. Other collaborators featured on the mixtape include Defari, Bishop Lamont, Chace Infinite, Dilated Peoples, U-N-I, Big Pooh, Aloe Blacc, Fashawn, Mickey Factz, Theo, Kes Kaos, Phonte, Montage One, Mitchy Slick, Big Twin, Diz Gibran, Stylistik Jones, Krondon, Rakaa Iriscience, as well as Crooked I. The mixtape track listing varies with songs from The Layover EP, commercial tracks that Evidence rapped over, and Dilated Peoples' Fresh Rhymes and Videotape EP.

Track listing

Chart history

References 

2008 EPs
Albums produced by the Alchemist (musician)
Albums produced by Evidence (musician)
Albums produced by Khrysis